Gerpinnes is a municipality of Wallonia located in the province of Hainaut, Belgium. 

On 1 January 2018 the municipality had 12,660 inhabitants. The total area is 47.10 km², giving a population density of 269 inhabitants per km².

Every year at Whitsun, a large procession is organised in honour of Saint Rolendis (Sainte Rolende). Participants are dressed as Napoleonic soldiers, and walk about 40 km around the whole municipality.

Villages and towns
Acoz (site of Acoz Castle)
Gougnies
Joncret
Loverval
Villers-Poterie

References

External links
 
 Website of the administration of Gerpinnes (French)
 Website of the Scouts "Frère Pierre" of Gerpinnes (French)
 Website of the tourism office of Gerpinnes (French-English-Dutch)

Municipalities of Hainaut (province)